Wayne Peterson (born May 24, 1938) is an American professional stock car racing owner/driver and former paratrooper and United States Army Special Forces member. He currently operates Wayne Peterson Racing, a team in the ARCA Menards Series.

Military career
Peterson grew up in a poor family in Boaz, Alabama, and when he was 15 years old, his high school was visited by Army National Guard recruiters. Attracted by the benefits of food and clothing, he enlisted and entered active duty at 16, but was sent back to school upon discovering his age. After graduating, he returned to the military and was stationed at Fort Bragg as a paratrooper in the XVIII Airborne Corps. Peterson was a member of the United States Army Parachute Team (Golden Knights), and worked with NASA on performing High Altitude Low Opening (HALO) landings.

He was later assigned to the Third United States Army for 30 days, during which he was placed in the 77th and attended Ranger School in Fort Benning, followed by survival training in Antarctica and language studies in California, the latter in which he learned French and Vietnamese. Peterson served in Germany and Okinawa with the 10th and 1st Special Forces Groups, respectively, before being deployed to Vietnam in 1963 as an advisor and eventually a combat role. He served multiple tours during the Vietnam War until 1972.

In 1961, Peterson trained Cuban refugees and participated in the failed Bay of Pigs Invasion. Two years later, he guarded President John F. Kennedy's body in the United States Capitol rotunda after his assassination. He also served as Richard Nixon and South Vietnamese President Nguyễn Văn Thiệu's English/Vietnamese translator.

Peterson was scheduled to complete his service in 1980 when the government extended it by 13 months. He was ordered to Diego Garcia, where plans were made for Operation Eagle Claw, an effort to free United States embassy members in the Iran hostage crisis. However, the mission failed after two aircraft were destroyed during refueling. Peterson compared the debacle and resulting public backlash to that received by American troops withdrawing from Vietnam: "We had to abort, put our tail between our legs, same way we came out of Nam. We just didn't finish the job. [...] We had way too much TV coverage in Nam. The public don't need to know our missions; it messed with intelligence. Nam was a hard time, soldiers condemned for pulling the trigger. Of course, if you waited one second and thought about it, you were dead. We fought for the country, and our own survival. It wasn't pretty. You were there to save your people."

Racing career
As a young teenager, Peterson swept floors for a dirt track racing owner who would let him test his car. While he was stationed at Fort Bragg, he purchased a 1948 Hudson and converted it into a dirt track car. Peterson later joined NASCAR driver Lee Petty's crew as a gasman, followed by a tenure with Junior Johnson on the DiGard Motorsports team. As compensation, Johnson gave him a car, which he fielded for Lennie Pond at Talladega Superspeedway. He also competed in modified stock cars in the 1970s.

During the 1980s, he began competing in the Automobile Racing Club of America. In 1983, he entered the NASCAR Winston Cup Series' Atlanta Journal 500, but spun out during qualifying due to tire issues. The following year, he tried to qualify for the Daytona 500, but did not make the race after suffering an engine failure in his Twin 125 qualifier and finishing tenth in the consolation race.

Wayne Peterson Racing fields various cars in the ARCA Racing Series. Drivers included Tim Mitchell, a colorectal cancer survivor who raced for the team in the 2000s; Zachary Gibson, son of ARCA Midget Series racer Larry Gibson and grandson of Indianapolis 500 driver Todd Gibson, in 2009; and NASCAR Gander Outdoors Truck Series driver Clay Greenfield in 2004. Greenfield, described by The Leaf-Chronicle as a "talented kid with no name", finished 12th in his series debut at Salem Speedway, marking the team's strongest finish since 1998. As of 2020, Tim Richmond, Steve Cronenwett and Jim Walker share the team's best race finish of ninth at Toledo Speedway and Talladega in 2004 as well as Toledo in 2020, respectively.

Personal life
Peterson was married to Sarah Peterson and has three sons, Michael, Brian, and Kevin, and five grandchildren of one is Ben Peterson whom competed in ARCA in 2019. Sarah died in February 2008. Peterson currently resides in Pulaski, TN.

Motorsports career results

NASCAR
(key) (Bold – Pole position awarded by qualifying time. Italics – Pole position earned by points standings or practice time. * – Most laps led.)

Winston Cup Series

Daytona 500

ARCA Menards Series
(key) (Bold – Pole position awarded by qualifying time. Italics – Pole position earned by points standings or practice time. * – Most laps led.)

ARCA Menards Series East

 Season still in progress

References

External links
 
 
 
 

1938 births
People from Boaz, Alabama
Racing drivers from Alabama
United States Army soldiers
United States Army personnel of the Vietnam War
Military personnel from Alabama
ARCA Menards Series drivers
NASCAR drivers
Living people